A Markov chain on a measurable state space is a discrete-time-homogeneous Markov chain with a measurable space as state space.

History 

The definition of Markov chains has evolved during the 20th century. In 1953 the term Markov chain was used for stochastic processes with discrete or continuous index set, living on a countable or finite state space, see Doob. or Chung. Since the late 20th century it became more popular to consider a Markov chain as a stochastic process with discrete index set, living on a measurable state space.

Definition 
Denote with  a measurable space and with  a Markov kernel with source and target .

is satisfied for any . One can construct for any Markov kernel and any probability measure an associated Markov chain.

Remark about Markov kernel integration 
For the measure  defined by  we used the following notation:

Basic properties

Starting in a single point 

for a -integrable function . By definition, we have then
.

We have for any measurable function  the following relation:

Family of Markov kernels 
For a Markov kernel  with starting distribution  one can introduce a family of Markov kernels  by

.

Stationary measure 
A probability measure  is called stationary measure of a Markov kernel  if

holds for any . If  on 
have the same probability distribution, namely:

for any .

Reversibility 
A Markov kernel  is called reversible according to a probability measure  if

holds for any .

See also 
 Harris chain
 Subshift of finite type

References 

Markov processes